Gibberula albotriangularis is a species of sea snail, a marine gastropod mollusk, in the family Cystiscidae.

References

albotriangularis
Gastropods described in 1997
Cystiscidae